Willcox High School is a high school in Willcox, Arizona. It is part of the Willcox Unified School District.

Fire
Overnight on 12 January 2011, a fire destroyed a classroom building at Willcox High, which represented half the school. The building on the combined middle school/high school campus housed a lab and several other classrooms. Classes were canceled for the remainder of the week. Most of the school's textbooks were destroyed in the fire.

Upon this, students in the Vail School District, first from Empire High School then from the whole district, sent a shipment of copy paper.

References

Public high schools in Arizona
Schools in Cochise County, Arizona
Willcox, Arizona